"Spark" is a song performed by Scottish singer Amy Macdonald. The song is her second single released from her album A Curious Thing and was released in the UK on 10 May 2010. The song has charted in Austria, Belgium, Germany and Switzerland, however it was the first time a single failed to chart in the UK.

Background
Macdonald began writing songs for her second album in spring 2009, in a brief break from her touring commitments. For the first time she began poring through her old notebooks, looking at song ideas, unlike her debut which consists mainly of songs that she wrote straight away. Many of the tracks were inspired by real-life personalities or events from her daily life. "An Ordinary Life" is inspired by the "Z-list celebs" she saw flocking around Scots-born Hollywood actor Gerard Butler at a party he held in Glasgow late 2009 to mark the opening of his film Law Abiding Citizen. The tracks were recorded at Weller's BlackBarn Studios in Surrey.

Music video

The music video was filmed at Loch Lomond in Scotland. It starts with Macdonald walking down a slipway towards the Loch carrying a case she puts it down and starts playing the guitar with a caravan in the background, orange lines flash throughout the music video and the viewer can see different shots of the loch, the forest and Macdonald playing her guitar.

Track listing
Digital download
 "Spark"  – 3:07
 "Spark" (Acoustic Version – German Radio Tour) – 3:05

iTunes digital download
 "Spark" – 3:07
 "Your Time Will Come" (Farewell Olympic Studios Version) – 3:48
 "Spark" (Tom Middleton Mix) – 8:22
 "Don't Tell Me That It's Over" (Acoustic Version – German Radio Tour) – 3:07

German single-CD
 "Spark" – 3:07
 "Spark" (HR1 Acoustic Version) – 3:05
 "Spark" (Tom Middleton Mix) – 8:22
 "Don't Tell Me That It's Over" (HR1 Acoustic Version) – 3:07

Charts

Weekly charts

Release history

References

Amy Macdonald songs
2010 singles
Songs written by Amy Macdonald
2010 songs
Mercury Records singles